David Stephen Rossi is a fictional character in the CBS crime drama Criminal Minds, portrayed by Joe Mantegna. He is a Supervisory Special Agent in the FBI's Behavioral Analysis Unit, and has appeared from the episode "About Face", which was originally broadcast on October 31, 2007, during the show's third season. He is also portrayed as a younger man by Robert Dunne, in flashbacks as a Marine infantry private in Vietnam in 1969 and in his earlier years with the BAU in 1978.

Rossi begins the series returning to the FBI after a lengthy period of being semi-retired, with his return due to "unfinished business". He is shown to be emotionally tied to Aaron Hotchner (Thomas Gibson), as they both worked together during the early days of the Behavioral Analysis Unit. Rossi is also a writer, and is one of the team's senior and most decorated profilers. He replaced Jason Gideon, who was written out following Mandy Patinkin's abrupt departure from the series.

Mantegna has stated in an interview that the character was named after one of the policemen who had testified at the O. J. Simpson trial. Rossi's middle name, Stephen, is revealed in a flashback near the end of the tenth season episode, "Nelson's Sparrow".

Storylines

Backstory
Rossi was born and raised on Long Island, New York, in the town of Commack. As a child, he was friends with a young Emma Taylor, whom he refers to as the "one who got away". He was also close with Ray Finnegan (William Sadler), who eventually grew up to be a prominent local mobster. Rossi, however, avoided the lure of organized crime, and enlisted in the Marine Corps. He also admits in season 9, while interrogating a suspect, that when he was younger, he stuffed a young black boy who was on his baseball team into a locker and urinated on him at the pressure of the other team members.

Details of his military service are sketchy as Rossi rarely talks about it. He served in the Vietnam War and rose to the rank of Sergeant Major before retiring from the Corps; based on the backstory timelines, specifically the time in service required to rise to the rank of sergeant major and retire, he presumably served in the Marine Corps Reserve after joining the FBI. In the Season 8 episode "The Fallen", Rossi encounters his old unit commander, Sgt. Harrison Scott (Meshach Taylor), who has since become a homeless alcoholic living on the streets of Santa Monica, California. Through flashbacks, it is shown that Scott had saved Rossi's life in Vietnam when Rossi froze at an oncoming Viet Cong soldier. It is implied that they both served in the 1st Marine Division.

After being discharged from active duty, he was recruited by the FBI. He subsequently cut most ties with his former life, not even returning to Commack for Emma's funeral in early 2009. Rossi has had an apparently illustrious FBI career and sterling reputation, even outside the BAU confines. He claims to have "written the book" on hostage negotiation, and stepped in as a negotiator in when his fellow agents Reid and Prentiss were held hostage. He takes an annual leave to do cross-country lecture and book-signing tours, which apparently attract a lot of female fans, "if Barry Manilow isn't in town." He had worked with Hotchner prior to his initial retirement from the Bureau. To date Rossi has been married three times, but has said the only people he knows how to make happy are "divorce lawyers". In season seven, it is revealed that he had a son who died soon after his birth with his first wife, Caroline. In season 9, it is revealed that his second wife, Hayden Montgomery (Sheryl Lee Ralph), is African American, and later in season 10 he discovers she was pregnant when they divorced, and so that he has a daughter and a grandson.

Rossi has an affair with agent Erin Strauss (Jayne Atkinson), hinted at throughout the series starting late season 7.  The full details of the affair are never disclosed, but he reveals his feelings for her when she is murdered by serial killer John Curtis (Mark Hamill), aka "The Replicator"; upon learning of her death, the usually reserved Rossi becomes deeply emotional.

Despite growing up on Long Island, Rossi is apparently a Chicago Cubs fan, judging by the Cubs gear in his Quantico office, which may be a reference to Joe Mantegna being a Cubs fan and Chicago native.

It is hinted that he plays video games as Garcia mentions a report of an abducted child named "Niko Bellic", who Rossi points out to be a character from Grand Theft Auto IV, stating "What? I know things" as a response to the team's surprise. Also, in a season 8 episode, Rossi shows familiarity with the game "Gods of Combat", a fictionalized PC game which corrupts the minds of several young murder suspects.

Personality
In contrast to Hotchner and Gideon, Rossi is decisively extroverted, abrasive, and much less cerebral, though still highly disciplined and focused. In one episode, Emily Prentiss describes him as a "fussy, anal-retentive neat-freak who never leaves anything out of place", even color-coding his notes (blue pen for evidentiary items, red pen for supposition and theory). Intelligent and quick-witted, he seems to favor less polished, more traditional police methods in profiling and interrogation - for example, he had no idea what a PDA was. Nevertheless, he, Reid, and Gideon are the only characters who are known for being prolific writers. In later episodes, it is implied that he is more technically savvy than he was when first seen - in "Epilogue", he attributes his tiredness to a long session of Rock Band and not enough coffee the night before, but claims to have "wiped the floor" with Ringo Starr in the process, apparently on a high difficulty level.

Rossi is apparently something of a playboy, judging by what Agent Jennifer "JJ" Jareau (A.J. Cook) says to Technical Analyst Penelope Garcia (Kirsten Vangsness): "From what I hear, Rossi is the reason most of these fraternization rules even exist."  On one occasion he has come into a team meeting late and with an undone tie, leading colleague Derek Morgan (Shemar Moore) to ask if he is "working on wife number four".

It is implied that Rossi is quite wealthy. At times, he has deliberately flaunted his financial security to his superiors - for example, mentioning to Section Chief Erin Strauss during an interrogation session his grievances about how the price of gold is going up, and having to figure out when to sell. His wealth is also indicated by Rossi's favorite type of shoe (Italian suede), and an Italian Renaissance artwork he has in his office. In one episode, he also gives a young Catholic girl a check for $500 when she takes her First Holy Communion. In "Zoe's Reprise", he secretly pays for a young girl's funeral who was a fan of his books and was murdered the night she met Rossi. Also in season seven, Rossi makes his wealth apparent when the team coerces him to host a dinner in his mansion, and to bankroll a sting at a poker game rather than going through FBI channels for funding. In another episode, Rossi believes that a suspect's monogrammed shirt is a clue to his real name; he states that such shirts are expensive, adding "trust me." At the end of season 7, Rossi hosts an elaborate party at his mansion, where he later hosts Jennifer Jarreau (A.J. Cook) and William LaMontagne, Jr.'s (Josh Stewart) wedding.

On the Job
Rossi was in early retirement until his voluntary return to the BAU in 2007, replacing Jason Gideon. Rossi had retired in order to write books and go on lecture tours, but returned to "settle some unfinished business". As he had served in an early form of the BAU, it was initially hard for Rossi to acclimate to the current team structure, but he eventually adjusted.

Rossi revealed to a local sheriff his reason for returning to the BAU, holding out a charm bracelet with the names of three children from one of his first cases. The children had found their parents bludgeoned to death in the family home with an axe. Rossi had promised the children he would find out who killed their parents, but the BAU was unable to solve the case. Each year on Christmas Eve, Rossi called the children to let them know he had not forgotten them and had not given up on solving their parents' murders. He kept with this tradition through his return to the BAU, though none of the children had replied to his most recent calls. After going unsolved for 20 years, the case was finally solved when the BAU found that a mentally disabled carny clown had committed the murders accidentally when he broke into the house to play with the oldest daughter. The father had surprised the man in the parents' bedroom and triggered the resulting attacks. After the murders, Rossi had purchased the family's home to assist the children's grandmother, who was raising them following their parents' death. Rossi returned the house to the children, with the request that they use the proceeds to better their lives. After finally solving the case, Rossi also attempted to return the charm bracelet to the children, but they requested that he keep it. Although he had identified the need to solve this case as his reason for returning to the BAU, Rossi remained with the team after it was solved.

In "Hanley Waters", as he is being interviewed about Prentiss' "apparent death" by Hotchner instead of Strauss, he reveals that he feels more married to his job than to his three ex-wives. He even proposes a toast with Hotchner, to commemorate Prentiss and Hotchner's deceased wife Haley (Meredith Monroe).

In the season six finale, he is almost shot in the face by a suspect pretending to be a victim of human trafficking; however, Morgan's quick reaction saves his life. Later he meets Jareau in his office after solving the case. She meets him to let him know that she is returning to the team.

In season seven, Rossi is just as surprised as the others to learn that Prentiss is alive. However, in "Proof", he mentions to Hotchner that he had an inkling that Prentiss wasn't dead. As he has no children from his previous marriages, Rossi has adopted the BAU team as his own family and invites them to his house for dinner.

In "From Childhood's Hour", Rossi was having breakfast with his first ex-wife, Caroline Baker (Isabella Hofmann), born June 8, 1955, but before she can tell him something, the BAU calls. Before Rossi leaves, he invites her to dinner at his place when he gets back. During the case, Rossi seems distracted, before he reveals to Prentiss that the reason he invited Caroline to dinner to see if "the old spark is still there". At the end of the episode, Caroline is at Rossi's house for dinner. After, Caroline reminds Rossi that the promise that they made to each other after their divorce, saying that they would be there for one another. She also tells him that she has had ALS for about a year and its getting worse (she has 18 months to live) then requests Rossi to end her life when the symptoms become too physically incapacitating.

After some personal deliberation, Rossi comes to the conclusion that he cannot assist Caroline in ending her life, for life is worth living, but she refuses for not having anything to fight for. He goes to her to tell her this, and she reveals that she always knew that he would refuse, saying she is just glad that he could be with her. Rossi then asks, horrified, "what have you done?" and looks to the bedside table to see an empty bottle of pills. Caroline begs him not to call 911 and to let her die as she lived, not in a hospital. Tearfully, Rossi holds her as she slips away. Just before falling asleep, Caroline asks "do you think he'll be there?" to which Rossi crying replies, "I'm sure he will." She died on October 26, 2011.

Later, he is seen sipping a glass of wine at her grave, and next to her grave is shown a gravestone reading "James David Rossi", "beloved son", with the same birth and death date, 26 April 1979, implying David and Caroline had a son who was either stillborn or had died during or shortly after birth.

In "Profiling 101", convicted serial killer Tommy Yates (Adam Nelson) boasts to Rossi about killing and mutilating a total of 101 women and gives him a list of 40 victims' names. Yates makes a deal with Rossi and the FBI to avoid the death penalty in exchange for revealing one additional name per year on a "special day", which proves to be Rossi's birthday.

In "Annihilator" he is forced into retirement when assistant director of National Security Linda Barnes (Kim Rhodes) reassigns the BAU. However, he is reinstated by the end of the next episode.

Rossi carries a Springfield Professional Model 1911-A1 .45 ACP pistol as his duty sidearm.  Only active or former members of the FBI's Hostage Rescue Team and Regional SWAT teams are authorized to carry that pistol.  Although never mentioned this would seem to indicate that Rossi served on one or both of these elite FBI tactical units at one time during his FBI career.

Awards and decorations
In "Anonymous", Rossi's military awards and decorations can be clearly seen in a shadowbox hanging on his office wall.  The following are the medals and service awards fictionally worn by Sgt. Maj. Rossi.

References

External links

Fictional Italian American people
Criminal Minds characters
Fictional Behavioral Analysis Unit agents
Fictional characters from New York (state)
Fictional United States Marine Corps personnel
Fictional Vietnam War veterans
Fictional writers
Television characters introduced in 2007
American male characters in television